The 1982 season was the Hawthorn Football Club's 58th season in the Victorian Football League and 81st overall. This was the first time since 1978 Hawthorn qualified for finals.

Fixture

Premiership season

Finals series

Ladder

References

Hawthorn Football Club seasons